Lament is a Mexican death metal/power metal band. that originated in Mexico City in 1993.

Background
Lament formed in 1993 under the name Beheaded. The original genre was along the lines of grindcore and brutal death metal. In 1996, the band switched their name to Lament after the death of Drummer Arturo Guzman. Soon after changing names, the band went to a music festival, where the band met Steve Rowe of Mortification. In 1997, the band recorded their debut album Tears of a Leper. The artwork was apparently controversial, so the band had to use an alternative cover. In 1998, the band was dropped by Rowe Productions and lost their original vocalist Marcos Pérez. The band released their third album, Breathless in 2001 through Kingdom. Eight years later, the band released Renaissance, through Lament Records, label that the band formed as a way to independently release their material. Four years later, the band released Left Behind in 2013. In 2017, it was announced that Lament, alongside Dehumanize, had signed to Vision of God Records and were reissuing Tears of a Leper and were working on new material.

Lament Records has signed additional bands and they have distribution through Vision of God Records in the United States.

Members
Current
 Abel Gómez – drums, (1996–2015), guitars, (1993–1996, 2015–present), vocals (1998–2013, 2013–present)
 Erick Conde – guitars (1993–present)
 Jorge Lopez – bass (2014–present)
 Dylan Hernandez – drums (2018–present)

Former
 Marcos Pérez – vocals (1993–1998)
 Fidel Sanchez – vocals (2013)
 Apolos León – guitars (1996–2001)
 Benjamin Rojas – guitars (1996–2001)
 Edmundo Mondragon – guitars (2001–2007)
 Benjamin Gomez – guitars (2007–2012)
 Elias Santillan – guitars (2012–2015)
 Jesus Torres
 Iram Gómez – bass (1994–2013)
 Carlos Daniel Renteria – bass (2013–2014)
 Arturo Guzman – drums (1993–1996) (died 1996)
 Miguel Martinez – drums (2013–2015)
 Juan Rangel – drums (2015–2018)

Discography

As Beheaded
Demos
 El Valle de la Decisión (1994)

As Lament
Studio albums
 Tears of a Leper (1997)
 Through the Reflection (1999)
 Breathless (2001)
 Renaissance (2009)
 The Ancient Battle of the Saints (2018)

EPs
 Left Behind (2013)

Compilations
 Best of Lament: 14 Years Rocking the World (2007)

References

External links
 
 Lament on Myspace
 

Christian metal musical groups
Musical groups established in 1993
Rowe Productions artists
Vision of God Records artists
Power metal musical groups
Mexican death metal musical groups
Bombworks Records artists